Chauliodon is a genus of flowering plants from the orchid family, Orchidaceae. It contains only one known species, Chauliodon deflexicalcaratum, native to tropical Africa (Ghana, Ivory Coast, Liberia, Nigeria, Cameroon, Gabon, Congo-Kinshasa).

See also
 List of Orchidaceae genera

References

 Pridgeon, A.M., Cribb, P.J., Chase, M.A. & Rasmussen, F. eds. (1999). Genera Orchidacearum 1. Oxford Univ. Press.
 Pridgeon, A.M., Cribb, P.J., Chase, M.A. & Rasmussen, F. eds. (2001). Genera Orchidacearum 2. Oxford Univ. Press.
 Pridgeon, A.M., Cribb, P.J., Chase, M.A. & Rasmussen, F. eds. (2003). Genera Orchidacearum 3. Oxford Univ. Press
 Berg Pana, H. 2005. Handbuch der Orchideen-Namen. Dictionary of Orchid Names. Dizionario dei nomi delle orchidee. Ulmer, Stuttgart

External links

Orchids of Africa
Monotypic Epidendroideae genera
Vandeae genera
Angraecinae
Taxa named by Émile Auguste Joseph De Wildeman